Plectrohyla dasypus (common name: Honduras spikethumb frog) is a species of frog in the family Hylidae. It is endemic to the Sierra de Omoa in the Cortés Department of northwestern Honduras. The species range is within the Cusuco National Park.

Natural habitats of Plectrohyla dasypus are lower montane wet forests. They are found on low vegetation along streams and in arboreal bromeliads, and breed in streams. Once moderately common, the species has undergone a dramatic decline that is attributed to chytridiomycosis.

References

dasypus
Endemic fauna of Honduras
Amphibians of Honduras
Frogs of North America
Critically endangered fauna of North America
Amphibians described in 1981
Taxonomy articles created by Polbot